Pholadomyidae is a taxonomic family of saltwater clams, marine bivalve molluscs in the order Anomalodesmata.

Genera and species
Genera and species within the family Pholadomyidae include:
Panacca
Panacca arata (A. E. Verrill and S. Smith, 1881)
Panacca loveni (Jeffreys, 1881)
Pholadomya Sowerby, 1823
Pholadomya candida Sowerby, 1823
Pholadomya maoria Dell, 1963
Wilkingia†

References

 
Bivalve families